Casa Verona's Mosque is a mosque in the Muthialpet area of Georgetown in Chennai, India. It is one of the oldest mosques in the city and was constructed by Casa Verona, a dubash of the British East India Company.

History 

Casa Verona, or Kasi Viranna, was a Hindu merchant from Madras who traded with the Sultanate of Golconda. He was so close to the Sultans of Golconda that they even gave him a Muslim name, Hasan Khan. The mosque was built in the land which belonged to him a little before his death in 1680.

References 

 

Mosques in Chennai